Golja is a surname. Notable people with the surname include: 

Ana Golja, Canadian actress and singer
Lana Golja, Australian actress
Suzana Golja, Croatian handball player